The FIA Motorsport Games Formula 4 Cup was the first FIA Motorsport Games Formula 4 Cup, held at ACI Vallelunga Circuit, Italy on 1 November to 3 November 2019. The race was contested with identical Formula 4 cars.  The event was part of the 2019 FIA Motorsport Games.

The event featured two 45-minute practice sessions on 1 November, with a 20-minute Qualifying session on 2 November for the Qualifying race, while the Main race was held on 3 November.

Entry list
All drivers utilized KCMG KC MG-01 cars, which were operated by Hitech GP. It was the first Formula 4 car to feature Halo safety device.

Results

Qualifying

Qualifying Race

Main Race

References

External links

Formula 4 Cup
2019 in Formula 4